Castellammare may refer to one of the following places:

Castello a Mare or Castellammare, an ancient fortress and an ancient quarter of the historic center of Palermo, Sicily
Castellammare, Los Angeles, a neighborhood in Pacific Palisades, California
Castellammare di Stabia, a commune in Napoli province, Campania region
Castellammare del Golfo, a town in Trapani province, Sicily, noted for being the birthplace of many prominent American Mafia figures
Castellammare Adriatico, former Italian municipality of Abruzzo region, annexed in the territory of Pescara in 1927
Gulf of Castellammare, a bay in Sicily